Anneli Martini (born 21 December 1948) is a Swedish actress. Since 1977, she has appeared in more than thirty films over four decades.

Selected filmography

References

External links
 

1948 births
Living people
People from Malmö
Swedish film actresses
Swedish television actresses